Francisco Alejandro Santos Carmona (born March 9, 1974) is a former Major League Baseball outfielder who played for the San Francisco Giants in .

He played for six seasons in the minor leagues. During the 2001 season with the Hagerstown Suns, he was selected for the South Atlantic League All-Star Game. During this season, he had personal season highs in the areas of plate appearances, at bats, runs, home runs, runs batted in, stolen bases and bases on balls. At the time he was known as a 20-year-old 1st baseman, Deivis Santos. However, it was revealed in 2003 that Santos' first name was in fact named Francisco and that he was 29 years old. Therefore, when he had his All Star season in Hagerstown he was in fact 27 years old.

References

External links

1974 births
Living people
Dominican Republic expatriate baseball players in the United States
Fresno Grizzlies players
Hagerstown Suns players

Major League Baseball players from the Dominican Republic
Major League Baseball right fielders
Newark Bears players
Norwich Navigators players
San Francisco Giants players
Arizona League Giants players
Estrellas Orientales players
Salem-Keizer Volcanoes players
Shreveport Swamp Dragons players